Francois Gerhardus Joubert (1827–1903) was a Boer general. He was born in 1827 in the Cape Colony. He followed Andries Pretorius to the Transvaal and was elected to the People's Assembly. He became a leader during the First Boer War on December 17, 1880 and was the commander during the action at Bronkhorstspruit during which the British commander Colonel Anstruther died. He died in 1903.

Sources
Encyclopedia of Southern Africa. Eric Rosenthal. 1967.

Boer generals
1827 births
1903 deaths
People of the First Boer War